Geelick Run is a stream in the U.S. state of West Virginia.

Geelick Run (or G Lick Run) was so named for the fact an early settler carved the letter G carved on a tree along its banks.

See also
List of rivers of West Virginia

References

Rivers of Lewis County, West Virginia
Rivers of West Virginia